Arvéd  is a 2022 Czech psychological mystery drama directed by Vojtěch Mašek. It is loosely based on life of Jiří "Arvéd" Smíchovský. Film is inspired by a Faustian theme, telling a story of how far a person can go to achieve their goal. The filmmakers want Smíchovský's character to confront two totalitarian regimes (Nazism and the Communist regime) which he was involved with as he collaborated with both.

Plot
The film is about Jiří Arvéd Smíchovský. Story of his life and death are still surrounded by many secrets. During the war, as a Nazi confidant, he saved Štěpán Plaček from a concentration camp. After the war, their roles are reversed and Plaček repays the debt. He arranges that the court does not demand death for Arvéd for collaborating with the Nazis, but only sentences him to life imprisonment. However, mutual services do not end there. As a state security investigator, Plaček uses Arvéd to convict inconvenient people. He rewards him for his services with the benefits of being a prominent prisoner and above all with Arvéd's greatest drug - rare occult books from confiscated libraries. Arvéd and Plaček are playing a game of chess. The game for Arvéd's soul enters the finale.

Cast
Michal Kern as Arvéd
Saša Rašilov as Štěpán Plaček
Martin Pechlát as Josef Šábe
Jaroslav Plesl as Zenek
Vojtěch Vodochodský as Vlastík
Marián Labuda ml. as Franta
Petr Čtvrtníček as Vilda
Emanuel Fellmer as Bert Walden
Ivana Uhlířová as Andulka
Pavlína Štorková as Blanka
Tomáš Kobr as František Kabelák
Václav Rašilov as Felix de la Cámara
Marek Dluhoš as Demon

Production
The film received support of 11 million CZK from Czech Film State Fund. It is film debut of director Vojtěch Mašek. Shooting started in February 2022. Large portion of shooting took place in Prague-Kbely studios.

Release
The film premiered at Uherské Hradiště Film School on 3 August 2022. It entered theatres on 25 August 2022.

Reception
Arvéd received mixed to positive reviews. It holds 62% on Kinobox.cz.

References

External links
 
 Arvéd at CSFD.cz 

2022 films
Czech mystery films
Czech thriller films
Slovak drama films
Slovak biographical films
Slovak thriller films
2022 biographical drama films
2020s Czech-language films
2020s mystery films
Czech biographical drama films
Czech psychological drama films
Czech psychological thriller films